The 2021 FC Turan season is Turan's the first season in the Kazakhstan Premier League, the highest tier of association football in Kazakhstan, since 2001. Turan will also take part in the Kazakhstan Cup.

Season events
On 8 March, Turan announced the signing of Andrey Zaleski, Layonel Adams, Yevhen Smirnov, Stefan Živković, Milan Stojanović, Pavel Deobald and Nikita Bocharov.

On 30 March, Aleksandr Chizh joined Turan on loan from Dinamo Minsk for the season.

On 11 May, Wahyt Orazsähedow signed for Turan.

On 23 July, Turan announced the signing of Farhat Musabekov from Dordoi Bishkek.

On 30 July, Turan announced the signing of Yevhen Chumak from Metallurg Bekabad.

On 29 August, Turan announced the signing of Tamirlan Kozubayev from Shinnik Yaroslavl.

On 30 August, Turan announced the signings of Pavel Kriventsov from Kyzylzhar and Bekzhan Abdrakhman from Kyran.

Squad

Transfers

In

Loans in

Out

Released

Competitions

Overview

Premier League

Results summary

Results by round

Results

League table

Kazakhstan Cup

Group stage

Squad statistics

Appearances and goals

|-
|colspan="16"|Players away from Turan on loan:
|-
|colspan="16"|Players who left Turan during the season:

|}

Goal scorers

Clean sheets

Disciplinary record

References

External links

FC Turan seasons
Turan